The Ordnance QF 3-pounder Vickers (47 mm / L50) was a British artillery piece first tested in Britain in 1903. It was used on Royal Navy warships. It was more powerful than and unrelated to the older QF 3-pounder Hotchkiss, with a propellant charge approximately twice as large, but it initially fired the same Lyddite and steel shells as the Hotchkiss.

Development 
Starting in 1904, the Royal Navy bought over 154 of these for use as anti-torpedo boat weapons on capital ships and to arm smaller ships. British production of these guns started in 1905 at Vickers and by the time production stopped in 1936 a total of 600 weapons had been made.

Royal Navy use 

By 1911 about 193 guns of this type were in service, and they became standard equipment in the Royal Navy until 1915.  In that year, service during the First World War proved these weapons to be ineffective and they were quickly removed from most of the larger ships, some were mounted in armoured lorries as the main armaments of the Pierce-Arrow and Seabrook armoured lorries.  During the interwar years they were widely used to arm light ships and river craft.  A number of them were converted into anti-aircraft guns and by 1927 at least 62 guns had been converted.

See also 
 QF 3-pounder Hotchkiss: this gun's predecessor
 OQF 3-pounder gun: tank gun based on the Ordnance QF 3-pounder Vickers
 List of naval guns

References 
Notes

Bibliography
 British Vickers 3-pdr (1.4 kg) (1.85"/50 [47 mm]) QF Marks I and II
 Ian Buxton Big Gun Monitors:  The History of the Design, Construction and Operation of the Royal Navy's Monitors

External links 

 Tony DiGiulian, British Vickers 3-pdr (1.4 kg) (1.85"/50 (47 mm)) QF Marks I and II

47 mm artillery
World War I artillery of the United Kingdom
Vickers
Naval anti-aircraft guns
Naval guns of the United Kingdom
World War I naval weapons of the United Kingdom